The 2008 Euro Beach Soccer Cup was the tenth Euro Beach Soccer Cup, one of Europe's three major beach soccer championships of the 2008 beach soccer season, held in September 2008, in Baku, Azerbaijan.
Spain won the championship for the second time, with Switzerland finishing second. Hosts Azerbaijan beat Norway in the third place play off to finish third and fourth respectively.

A record low six teams participated in the tournament who were split into two groups of three, playing each other once in the groups. The third placed teams in each group played in a fifth place play off, the second placed teams in each group played in a third place play off and the winners of each group played in a final match to decide the winner of the tournament.

Participating nations

Group stage

Group A

Group B

Knockout stage

Fifth place play off

Third place play off

Final

Winners

Final standings

References

Euro Beach Soccer Cup
2008 in beach soccer